The Autodrome Saint-Eustache was a motor sport complex in Saint-Eustache, Quebec, Canada. Established in 1965, it contained a  paved oval and a  paved road course with hot pits, grandstands and services.

The oval circuit hosted NASCAR Whelen All-American Series weekly racing, with drivers racing for both the province (Quebec) and the rest of North America. Its premier event was the NASCAR Pinty's Series which raced at the track since the creation of the series.  The track also formerly held CASCAR Super Series events.

In an agreement with the City of Saint-Eustache, the property was sold to Hydro-Québec at the end of the 2019 racing season.  The expanding infrastructure of the city of Saint-Eustache was cited as the main reason for the track's demise.

See also
 List of auto racing tracks in Canada
 NASCAR Pinty's Series

External links

Official track website
Autodrome Saint-Eustache race results at Racing-Reference
Autodrome Saint-Eustache to Close

Motorsport venues in Quebec
CASCAR
NASCAR tracks
Saint-Eustache, Quebec
Sports venues in Quebec
Tourist attractions in Laurentides
Buildings and structures in Laurentides
Defunct motorsport venues in Canada